Hustle is a South African television drama series directed by Jahmil X.T. Qubeka with executive producers Bridget Pickering, Dan Jawitz and Neil Brandt. It is an e.tv original produced by Fireworx Media for  eKasi+ and stars Brenda Ngxoli, Zolisa Xaluva, Dineo Ranaka, Petronella Tshuma, Mandisa Nduna and Masello Motana. The series follows a washed-out superstar who attempts to redeem herself and revive her career.

Plot 
Kitt Khambule (Brenda Ngxoli) started her music career well in the 80s with The Sparrows, a trio with her sister and her best friend.  Her extraordinary voice and ambition led her to break away from the trio and rise to superstardom. Her career crashes and burns after a series of no-shows in her concerts, cut ties with those close to her, and her drug addiction. She tries making a comeback with her latest concert, only to fail again in pitching on time. This forces her to flee back home, broke, desperate and on the run from creditors. She takes street urchins Baby (Petronella Tshuma) and Thuli (Mandisa Nduna) through a journey, which eerily mirrors her own, to the height of stardom.

Cast 
 Brenda Ngxoli as Kitt
 Dineo Ranaka as Kedibone
 Zolisa Xaluva as Bra X
 Carlo Radebe as Jacob/Moses
 Masello Motana as Neo
 Andile Nebulane as Duma
 Angela Sithole as Tai Chi / Angel
 Lungelo Lubelwana as Sbu
 Mandisa Nduna as Thuli
 Mothusi Magano as Maxwell
 Lethabo Bereng as Pretty
 Petronella Tshuma as Baby
 Sisanda Henna as Moruti Sampson
 Nicole Bailey as Rea
 Alex Motswiri as Vusimusi
 Anthony Bishop as Vince

Production 
In an interview with City Press, Jahmil XT Qubeka, director of the series, described it as being very racy, filled with sex, drugs and music, and that “The sensibilities and the approach to the show aren’t typical,” says Qubeka. “We’re shooting a long feature on a TV schedule and on a TV budget.”

Filming took place around Johannesburg, as well as in Soweto.

Broadcast 
Hustle premiered on February 11, 2016, on the defunct eKasi+, and was aired for 13 episodes before the show went on a year-long hiatus. The series was initially thought to be removed on account of its risque sexual scenes, but resumed in January 2017, to coincide with the return transmission on e.tv, in a new timeslot of Wednesdays at 21h00. 23 episodes were aired on the channel, with the remaining episodes moved to eExtra, on Wednesday 5 April.

The series was later added to e.tv:s streaming service, eVOD.

References 

South African television series